Groom is a surname of English origin. Its English usage comes from the trade or profession, a person responsible for the feeding and care of horses, not to be confused with the much more socially distinguished roles in the English Royal Household of Groom of the Chamber, or Groom of the Privy Chamber, Groom of the Robes, Groom of the Stole, and Groom of the Stool.

History
The English etymology for Groom comes from the East Anglian occupational name for a servant or a shepherd, from Middle English grom(e) ‘boy’, ‘servant’ (of uncertain origin), which in some places was specialized to mean ‘shepherd’.

Popularity
 Groom ranks 5,545 out of 88,799 in popularity in the United States and is also common in Australia, Canada, New Zealand and the United Kingdom.

List
 Aaron Groom (born 1987), Fiji rugby league player
 Andy Groom (born 1979), American football punter
 Arthur Groom, multiple people, including:
Arthur Groom (politician) (1852–1922), Australian politician and land agent
Arthur Groom (writer) (1904–1953), Australian writer, conservationist, journalist and photographer
Arthur Hesketh Groom (1846–1918), British founder the Kobe Golf Club, Japan's first golf club
 Bob Groom (1884–1948), American baseball player
 Buddy Groom (born 1965), American baseball player
 Catherine Groom Petroski (born 1939), American author
 Chris Groom (born 1973), former Australian rules footballer
 Harry Marshall Groom BCL (1894–1964), New Brunswick lawyer and politician
 Henry Littleton Groom (1860–1926), member of Queensland Parliament, Australia
 Jerry Groom (1929–2008), nicknamed "Boomer," American football player
 Kathleen Clarice Groom (1872–1954), English author
 Karl Groom, British guitarist and producer
 Sir Littleton Groom, KCMG (1867–1936),  Australian Commonwealth Minister and Speaker of the House of Representatives
 Lorne B. Groom (1919–1994), New Brunswick optometrist and politician
 Mary Elizabeth Groom (1903–1958), British artist
 Michael Groom, multiple people, including:
Michael Groom (climber) (born 1959), Australian mountain climber
Michael Groom (footballer), New Zealand national football team member
 Nic Groom (born 1990), South African rugby union footballer
 Ray Groom (born 1944), Tasmanian premier (1992–1996)
 Robert Groom, multiple people, including:
Robert W. Groom, California State Assembly member
Robert Groom (cricketer) (1816–1891), English cricketer
 Roger Groom (born 1936), Australian politician
 Sam Groom (born 1939), American television actor
 Shea Groom (born 1993), American soccer player
 Simon Groom (born 1950), British television presenter
 Terry Groom (1944–2021), Australian politician
 Steve Conway (singer) (born Walter James Groom; 1920–1952), British singer
 William Henry Groom (1833–1901), member of the Parliament of Queensland and the Parliament of Australia
 Winston Groom (1943–2020), American novelist and nonfiction writer

See also
Groom (disambiguation), other things named Groom

References

Surnames
English-language surnames
Occupational surnames
English-language occupational surnames